Sobha Brahma (14 October 1929 – 2012) was an Indian painter and sculptor. He lived and worked in Guwahati. He graduated from the Kalabhavana Visva-Bharati University Shantiniketan West-Bengal. Brahma developed a unique individual style that mixed traditional folk and modern Indian art.

He served as the Principal of the Government College Of Arts and Crafts Assam, as the Vice-Chairman of the prominent cultural centre Srimanta Sankardev Kalakshetra, set up under the Assam Accord, and as a member of the general council of Lalit Kala Akademi.

Early life and education

Sobha Brahma was born on October 14, 1929 in Gossaihaon, Assam. Brahma attended Cotton College, Guwahati from 1948 to 1952. He received his Art education at Kalabhavan, Visva-Bharti Santiniketan, West Benga l from 1952 to 1957. He trained under several artists, including Nandalal Bose, Dhriendra Krishna Dev Barman and Ramkinkar Baij. In 1956, he participated at the 4th International Art Students Exhibition held in Prague Czechoslovakia.

In his early years, Brahma worked as an art teacher at Tarini Chowdhury HSMP School Guwahati, from 1955 to 1958. He participated in the decoration of the All India Congress session held at Pragjyotishpur in 1958. In 1959, Brahma was awarded a research scholarship by the Department of Tribal Culture and Folklore, Gauhati University. He subsequently made a tour of the tribal areas of the Bodos, Rabhas and Dimasa Kacharis to study their art materials, including their rich collection of variegated fabric designs.

From 1960 onward, Brahma worked as a teacher at the School of Arts and Crafts, Assam, which later became the Government College Of Arts and Crafts Assam. He was principal of the College from 1964 to 1989.

Contribution

Sobha Brahma was renowned as an author, sculptor, and painter throughout the north-eastern states of India . He was able to write in Bodo, Assamese, English, and Bengali. Besides writing essays, biographies, and memoirs, he was also a film director. Brahma translated many important art books into Assamese. His paintings have been featured in numerous solo and group exhibitions internationally. Many of his works were specially showcased in Dacca, Bangladesh; Sofia, Bulgaria; Rome, Italy; and Prague, Czech Republic.

His work is part of collections at the Government Museum, Chandigarh, the Assam State Museum, Lalit Kala Akademi and several government departments in Assam, as well as private collections in Assam, Shillong, Bombay, and Germany.

Silpokalar Navajanma (Assamese Book on Art) is one of his noted creations.

Honours and awards

He was honoured with felicitations from several social, cultural and art educational organizations such as the Assam Sahitya Sabha, the Bodo Sathitya Sabha, Kollol Gisthi of Nangoan, the Artist Guild of Guwahati, the State Bank of India and the Deputy Commissioner's Employees Association of Guwahati. In February 2000, he was artist-in-residence at the Lalit Kala Kendra, Kolkata.

Sobha Brahma was a member of the Central Lalit Kala Akademi, the New Delhi and the Assam Textbook Production Corporation. He served as vice-chairman of the Anundoram Borooah Institute of Language, Art and Culture, Guwahati.

Brahma was honored with the Assam Shilpi Dibash Award in 1977 and the Assam Government Artists pension in 1990. He was awarded the prestigious Kamal Kumari National Award in 1990 and the Assam State Bishnu Rabha Award in 1996.

Death
At the age of 82, Sobha Brahma died at Guwahati following a prolonged illness.

See also 
 Kamal Kumari National Award
 Lalit Kala Akademi
 Visva-Bharti Santiniketan

References

External links
 Indigenous Writers of India: North-East India Originally published: 1 January 2006 Author: R. K. Gupta
 Times of India – Artist Sobha Brahma no more Eminent artist-sculptor Sobha Brahma dead
 THE BODY AS CULTURAL AND POLITICAL ANATOMY – THE ART OF SHOBHA BRAHMA
 http://www.oocities.org/bipuljyoti/art/shobhabrahma.html
 http://www.assamtribune.com/scripts/detailsnew.asp?id=mar0612/at06 Kamal Kumari National Award
 https://books.google.com.au/books?id=FWCiWWeRCU4C&pg=PA74&lpg=PA74&dq=Sobha+Brahma+in+asomiya&source=bl&ots=ftY2g2AARh&sig=IvbcPmJdZLC--cD46QxgNj1r7gA&hl=en&sa=X&ved=0ahUKEwiYw6-q1-fTAhVJWCwKHZZbCw8Q6AEIVjAJ#v=onepage&q=Sobha%20Brahma%20in%20asomiya&f=false

1929 births
2012 deaths
20th-century Indian painters
Painters from Assam
Modern painters
Bodo people